Citrus oxanthera, synonym Oxanthera aurantium, is a species of plant in the family Rutaceae. Sometimes referred to commonly as the orange-flowered oxanthera, it is endemic to New Caledonia.

Taxonomy
Citrus oxanthera has historically been placed in a number of genera, including Atalantia and most recently, Oxanthera, commonly known as false oranges. Phylogenetic analysis showed that Oxanthera species clustered within Citrus, which makes this species a member of that genus, as had been suggested by Georges Beauvisage a century before.

References

 

Endemic flora of New Caledonia
oxanthera
Vulnerable plants
Taxonomy articles created by Polbot
Taxobox binomials not recognized by IUCN